Seamen's Home is a Danish hotel chain and may refer to:

 Seamen's Home (hotel chain)
Seamen's Home (Aalborg)
Seamen's Home (Aasiaat)
Seamen's Hotel (Hanstholm)
Seamen's Home (Nuuk)
Seamen's Home (Qaqortoq)
Seamen's Home (Sisimiut)
Seamen's Hotel (Tórshavn)